This list includes all 11 confirmed impact craters in South America as listed in the Earth Impact Database. These features were caused by the collision of large meteorites or comets with the Earth. For eroded or buried craters, the stated diameter typically refers to an estimate of original rim diameter, and may not correspond to present surface features.

Confirmed impact craters

Unconfirmed impact craters 

The following craters are officially considered "unconfirmed" because they are not listed in the Earth Impact Database.  Due to stringent requirements regarding evidence and peer-reviewed publication, newly discovered craters or those with difficulty collecting evidence generally are known for some time before becoming listed.  However, entries on the unconfirmed list could still have an impact origin disproven.

See also 

 Impact craters
 Impact events
 Bolides and Meteorites
 Earth Impact Database – primary source
 Traces of Catastrophe book from Lunar and Planetary Institute - comprehensive reference on impact crater science

References

External links 
 Earth Impact Database – List of confirmed earth impact sites at the Planetary and Space Science Centre, University of New Brunswick
 Impact Database (formerly Suspected Earth Impact Sites list) maintained by David Rajmon for Impact Field Studies Group, USA

 
South America
South America
Impact craters